Lawrie McKinna (born 8 July 1961) is a Scottish-Australian former football player, coach, and former Mayor of Gosford City Council.

In 2012, McKinna stood for election as an independent for City of Gosford. Lawrie was successful in gaining a seat, and was elected by his fellow councillors Mayor of Gosford City on 24 September.

He was removed from his position as Mayor, as a result of the amalgamation of Gosford and Wyong Councils on 12 May 2016.

Lawrie unsuccessfully stood as a candidate in the September 2013 Federal election for the seat of Robertson. His campaign was backed by John Singleton to the tune of $380,000. While receiving 8.7% of the vote, Singleton and McKinna controversially decided the outcome of the seat by directing preference votes to the conservative Liberal Party candidate Ms Lucy Wicks. Ms Wicks formally thanked Lawrie & his backer John Singleton in her maiden speech in parliament.

Early life
McKinna was born in Galston in southwest Scotland.

Playing career

Club
McKinna began his career as a striker with local junior side Darvel and made his debut for Scottish Football League side Kilmarnock in 1982. He made 87 league appearances for Kilmarnock, scoring 17 times before moving to Australia in 1986 where he went on to play for several more clubs in the NSL and various state leagues.

Management career
McKinna's coaching career began in 1992 with New South Wales side Blacktown City as assistant manager. In 1995 Hills United hired him as a player/manager (http://www.hillsbrumbies.com.au/). In 1997, he became assistant to David Mitchell with National Soccer League clubs Sydney Olympic, then following Mitchell to Sydney United in 1998 and Parramatta Power in 1999.

He left Parramatta Power in 2002 to take over as manager of Northern Spirit. His first season as a NSL coach was extremely promising and successful as he beat many accomplished coaches, and was awarded with the NSL coach of the year award after taking the Northern Spirit to their first finals campaign for three years.

Central Coast Mariners

In 2005, he was named as manager of the new A-League club the Central Coast Mariners, earning the inaugural A-League coach of the year award after leading the Mariners to the grand final and winning the preseason cup. In May 2006 he signed a new five-year contract with the Mariners.

McKinna was popular in the community for his insistence that all the players at the club engaged in community activities. This became a hallmark of his tenure at the fledgling club.

In the 2006/2007 season, McKinna gave an interview during which his team were struggling for on field success. Notably saying how it was frustrating for him when the press report losses in matches but don't mention the long-term injury's to the sides key players like Nik Mrdja, Andre Gumprecht and Noel Spencer. In the interview he also talked about his footballing coaching licenses and mentions that he would be preparing to take his '"Asian 'B' license" course soon.

On 9 February 2010, it was announced that McKinna will take over as the Football and Commercial Operations Manager for the Mariners from the 2010/2011 season, with Graham Arnold replacing him as head coach.

Chengdu Blades
Chinese Super League club Chengdu Blades have shown interest in McKinna taking over the reins as manager of the first team on 18 March 2011. A day later, he was appointed as the head coach of Chengdu Blades  a club known to have the lowest operating budget in the CSL.

On 15 August, it was confirmed by McKinna via his Twitter account, that he had resigned from his position as manager at the Blades. He cited off-field, back room issues as a major reason for his decision, which contributed to the Blades poor 2011 CSL season, in which at the time of McKinna's departure had seen them only win only twice, conceding 30+ goals, whilst only scoring 13, and the club at the bottom of the ladder after just 20 matches.

Chongqing Lifan
On 2 December 2011 it was announced that McKinna had signed a one-year contract with China League One side Chongqing Lifan. On 15 April 2012 he announced he was leaving the club after a disagreement with the board.

Central Coast Mariners
On 4 May 2012 it was announced that Lawrie would become the new Director of Football for the Central Coast Mariners. A position that he took on again temporarily for two months in 2014.

Newcastle Jets
In June 2016, McKinna was appointed chief executive of the Newcastle Jets.

After football
McKinna was elected a councillor of Gosford City Council in September 2012 and nominated as Mayor at the first council meeting.

In the 2013 Australian election, McKinna ran as a conservative independent for the seat of Robertson.

Managerial statistics

Honours

Player

Club
APIA Leichhardt:
NSL Cup: 1988

Manager

Club
Central Coast Mariners:
A-League Championship:
Finalists: 2006, 2008
A-League Premiership: 2007–08
A-League Challenge Cup: 2005
Finalists: 2006

Individual
 NSL Coach of the Year: 2002–03
 A-League Coach of the Year: 2005-2006

References

External links
 Central Coast Mariners profile
 Oz Football profile

Central Coast (New South Wales)
1961 births
Living people
Footballers from Kilmarnock
Scottish footballers
Australian soccer players
APIA Leichhardt FC players
Blacktown City FC players
Kilmarnock F.C. players
Wollongong Wolves FC players
Australian expatriate soccer players
Australian expatriate soccer coaches
Scottish expatriate footballers
Scottish expatriate football managers
Expatriate soccer players in Australia
Scottish Football League players
National Soccer League (Australia) players
Scottish football managers
Australian soccer coaches
A-League Men managers
Expatriate football managers in China
Darvel F.C. players
Central Coast Mariners FC non-playing staff
Association football forwards
Shire Presidents and Mayors of Gosford
Independent politicians in Australia
Scottish emigrants to Australia